The Old Masonic Hall in Louisville, Mississippi, also known as Community House, and as Chamber of Commerce, is a historic building built in 1851.  It was listed on the National Register of Historic Places in 1994 and was designated a Mississippi Landmark in 2007.  It is a notable example of Greek Revival style architecture.

The building was constructed by Louisville Lodge No. 75 (a local Masonic lodge).  Originally, the upper floor was used as a meeting hall for the lodge, while the lower floor housed the Masonic Female Institute.  The lower floor was subsequently used as school and a community center.  In 1922 the Masons moved to a new location, and the building was sold to the City of Louisville.  Since 1958 it has housed the local Chamber of Commerce.

References

Masonic buildings completed in 1851
Former Masonic buildings in Mississippi
Greek Revival architecture in Mississippi
Mississippi Landmarks
Clubhouses on the National Register of Historic Places in Mississippi
1851 establishments in Mississippi
National Register of Historic Places in Winston County, Mississippi